Robert Whitelaw (October 5, 1916 – October 6, 1972) was a Scottish-born Canadian professional ice hockey player who played 32 games in the National Hockey League with the Detroit Red Wings during the 1940–41 and 1941–42 seasons. The rest of his career, which lasted from  1936 to 1948, was mainly spent in the minor leagues. Whitelaw was born in Motherwell, Scotland, United Kingdom and raised in Winnipeg, Manitoba.

Career statistics

Regular season and playoffs

See also
List of National Hockey League players from the United Kingdom

External links

1916 births
1972 deaths
Canadian ice hockey defencemen
Detroit Red Wings players
Harringay Racers players
Indianapolis Capitals players
Pittsburgh Hornets players
Providence Reds players
Ice hockey people from Winnipeg
Wembley Lions players